Psalm 15 is the 15th psalm in the Book of Psalms, beginning in English in the King James Version: "Lord, who shall abide in thy tabernacle? who shall dwell in thy holy hill?" 

In the slightly different numbering system used in the Greek Septuagint and Latin Vulgate translations of the Bible, this psalm is Psalm 14. The Latin version begins "Domine quis habitabit in tabernaculo tuo".

The psalm is attributed to David. It is often called an 'entrance liturgy', in which a worshipper asks the conditions of entering the worship place and a priest answers. The psalm forms a regular part of Jewish, Catholic, Anglican, Eastern Orthodox Church and Protestant liturgies. It has been set to music, including compositions by Heinrich Schütz.

Text

Hebrew Bible version 
Following is the Hebrew text of Psalm 15:

King James Version 
 Lord, who shall abide in thy tabernacle? who shall dwell in thy holy hill?
 He that walketh uprightly, and worketh righteousness, and speaketh the truth in his heart.
 He that backbiteth not with his tongue, nor doeth evil to his neighbour, nor taketh up a reproach against his neighbour.
 In whose eyes a vile person is contemned; but he honoureth them that fear the LORD. He that sweareth to his own hurt, and changeth not.
 He that putteth not out his money to usury, nor taketh reward against the innocent. He that doeth these things shall never be moved.

Analysis
According to the International Critical Commentary, "Ps[alm] 15 is a didactic poem, inquiring what sort of man is qualified to be a guest of Yahweh (verse 1); describing him in accordance with a decalogue of duties (verses 2-5b) and declaring such a man secure (verse 5c)." The duties listed emphasise virtues relating to one's neighbor.

The main topic of this psalm is "residence" (verse 1: "dwell"... "live") in God's "tent" (not "sanctuary") and how to be in 'holiness, without which no one sees God'.

Although the Psalm is captioned "A Psalm of David", and the Gemara also attributes this Psalm to David, Charles and Emilie Briggs considered this claim of authorship "unhistoric".

Context
In Psalm 12 the godly perished and in Psalm 14 there is none righteous. That leaves a rhetorical question as to "who can ascend the mountain of God?" which is an inclusio (a pair of literary bookends) in Psalms 15–24, appearing in Psalm 15:1 and Psalm 24:3.

In the context of the culture of the time, "who [then] can dwell in His tent" as a guest would not only be welcome but also come under his special protection.

In the context of David's time, the ark has been in Shiloh in the tabernacle, and David moves the ark to Mount Zion to a newly made tabernacle there.

Uses

Christianity
Some see a chiastic structure of Psalms 15–24, with Psalm 19 in the center.

Many see Jesus as the one who can climb the hill of God and dwell in God's sanctuary, with the church in Him. This is supported by the frequent use of the phrase "right hand [of God]" in each of Psalms 16–21, except for Psalm 19. The right hand of God usually refers to an act of salvation. This Psalm is appointed as one of the Proper Psalms for Ascension Day.

Charles Spurgeon sees this psalm as an expectation of fruit in a believer's life.
Without the wedding-dress of righteousness in Christ Jesus, we have no right to sit at the banquet of communion. Without uprightness of walk we are not fit for the imperfect church on earth, and certainly we must not hope to enter the perfect church above.

Judaism
Verse 4 is found in the repetition of the Amidah during Rosh Hashanah.

Musical settings
Heinrich Schütz set a metric version of Psalm 15 in German, "Wer wird, Herr, in der Hütten dein", as part of the Becker Psalter, SWV 111.

References

Sources

External links 

 
 
  in Hebrew and English – Mechon-mamre
 Text of Psalm 15 according to the 1928 Psalter
 A psalm of David. / LORD, who may abide in your tent? / Who may dwell on your holy mountain? text and footnotes, usccb.org United States Conference of Catholic Bishops
 Psalm 15:1 introduction and text, biblestudytools.com
 Psalm 15 – The Character of the One God Receives enduringword.com
 Psalm 15 / Refrain: Through the greatness of your mercy, I will come into your house. Church of England
 Hymns for Psalm 15 hymnary.org
 Charles Spurgeon's commentary on Psalm 15

015
Works attributed to David